Phu Khi Suk, known in Khmer as Phnom Dângrêk is a  mountain in Ubon Ratchathani Province, Thailand.

Geography
Phu Khi Suk is the highest peak of the Dângrêk Range, rising at the east end of the long mountain chain. It is close to the Chong Bok (603 m) area, a tripoint where the borders of Thailand, Laos, and Cambodia intersect.

See also
List of mountains in Thailand

References

External links
Earth-3D - Phu Khi Suk
Phu Khi Suk, Peakery

Geography of Ubon Ratchathani province
Mountains of Thailand
Dângrêk Mountains